The following is a discography of production credited to Marley Marl.

1983

Dimples D. -  Sucker D.J.'s (I Will Survive) 12"
 A1. "Sucker D.J.'s (I Will Survive)"
 B1. "Sucker D.J.'s (I Will Survive) (Marley Marl's Booty Dub)"

1984

Roxanne Shante - Roxanne's Revenge 12"
 A1. "Roxanne's Revenge (Street Version)"

1986

Steady B -  Bring the Beat Back 
 02. "Get Physical"

1987

MC Shan - Down by Law 
 01. "Jane, Stop This Crazy Thing!"
 02. "Project Ho"
 03. "The Bridge"
 04. "Kill That Noise"
 05. "Down by Law"
 06. "Left Me Lonely"
 07. "Another One to Get Jealous Of"
 08. "MC Space"
 09. "Living in the World of Hip Hop"

Kool G Rap & DJ Polo - Rikers Island  / Rhyme Tyme 12 
 A1. "Rikers Island"
 B1. "Rhyme Tyme"

Heavy D. & the Boyz - Living Large 
 01. "The Overweight Lover's In the House"

1988

Big Daddy Kane - Long Live the Kane 
 01. "Long Live The Kane"
 02. "Raw (Remix)"
 03. "Set It Off"
 04. "The Day You're Mine"
 05. "On The Bugged Tip"
 06. "Ain't No Half Steppin'"
 07. "I'll Take You There"
 08. "Just Rhymin' With Biz"
 09. "Mister Cee's Master Plan"
 10. "Word To The Mother (Land)"

Biz Markie - Goin' Off 
 01. "Pickin' Boogers"
 02. "Albee Square Mall"
 03. "Biz is Goin' Off"
 04. "Return of the Biz Dance"
 05. "Vapors"
 06. "Make the Music with Your Mouth, Biz"
 07. "Biz Dance, Pt. 1"
 08. "Nobody Beats the Biz"
 09. "This Is Something for the Radio"
 10. "Cool V's Tribute to Scratching"

Marley Marl - In Control, Volume 1 
 01. "Droppin' Science" (feat. Craig G)
 02. "We Write the Songs" (feat. Heavy D and Biz Markie)
 03. "The Rebel" (feat. Tragedy Khadafi) 
 04. "Keep Your Eyes on the Prize" (feat. Masta Ace and Action) 
 05. "The Symphony" (feat. Masta Ace, Craig G, Kool G Rap and Big Daddy Kane) 
 06. "Live Motivator" (feat. Tragedy Khadafi)
 07. "Duck Alert" (feat. Craig G)
 08. "Simon Says" (feat. Masta Ace and Action)
 09. "Freedom" (feat. MC Shan) 
 10. "Wack Itt" (feat. Roxanne Shanté)

MC Shan - Born to Be Wild 
 01. "I Pioneered This"
 02. "Give Me My Freedom"
 03. "So Def"
 04. "Back To The Basics"
 05. "Go For Yours ('Cause I'm Gonna Get Mine)"
 06. "Born To Be Wild"
 07. "She's Gone"
 08. "Juice Crew Law"
 09. "Words Of A Freestyle"
 10. "They Used To Do It Out In The Park"
 11. "Never Rock A Party"

1989

Kool G Rap & DJ Polo - Road to the Riches 
 01. "Road to the Riches"
 02. "It's a Demo"
 03. "Men at Work"
 04. "Truly Yours"
 05. "Cars"
 06. "Trilogy of Terror"
 07. "She Loves Me, She Loves Me Not"
 08. "Cold Cuts"
 09. "Rhymes I Express"
 10. "Poison"
 11. "Butcher Shop"

Heavy D. & the Boyz - Big Tyme 
 05. "EZ Duz It, Do It EZ"
 07. "Gyrlz, They Love Me"
 11. "Here We Go Again, Y'all

Big Daddy Kane - It's a Big Daddy Thing 
 05. "Young, Gifted and Black"
 17. "Rap Summary (Lean On Me) (Remix)"

Craig G - The Kingpin 
 01. "Love Thang"
 02. "Dopest Duo"
 03. "Rock the House"
 04. "First Day of School"
 05. "Shootin' the Gift"
 06. "Slammin'"
 07. "Turn This House Into a Home"
 08. "The Kingpin"
 09. "The Final Chapter"
 10. "Why'd You Have to Go?"
 11. "Smooth"
 12. "The Blues"

MC Lyte - Eyes on This 
 03. "Cappucino"

Roxanne Shante - Bad Sister 
 01. "Bad Sister"
 02. "Live on Stage"
 03. "Independent Woman"
 04. "Knockin' Hiney"
 05. "My Groove Gets Better"
 07. "Have a Nice Day"
 08. "Let's Rock, Y'all"
 09. "Fatal Attraction"
 10. "Wack Itt (Remix)"
 11. "Skeezer"
 12. "What's on Your Mind"
 14. "Gotta Get Paid" (feat. Craig G)

1990

Tragedy Khadafi - Intelligent Hoodlum 
 01. "Intelligent Hoodlum"
 02. "Back to Reality"
 04. "No Justice, No Peace"
 05. "Party Animal"
 06. "Black & Proud"
 08. "Microphone Check"
 09. "Keep Striving"
 10. "Party Pack"
 11. "Arrest the President"
 12. "Your Tragedy"

Master Ace - Take a Look Around 
All tracks co-produced by Master Ace.
 01. "Music Man" 
 03. "Letter to the Better (Remix)" 
 04. "Me and The Biz" 
 05. "The Other Side of Town" 
 06. "Ace Iz Wild" 
 07. "Four Minus Three" 
 09. "Movin' On" 
 10. "Brooklyn Battles" 
 11. "Maybe Next Time" 
 14. "Take a Look Around" 
 15. "Together"

LL Cool J - Mama Said Knock You Out 
All tracks co-produced by LL Cool J.
 01. "The Boomin' System" 
 02. "Around The Way Girl" 
 03. "Eat 'em Up, L Chill" >
 04. "Mr. Good Bar" 
 05. "Murdergram" 
 06. "Cheesy Rat Blues" 
 07. "Farmers Blvd. (Our Anthem)" 
 08. "Mama Said Knock You Out" 
 09. "Milky Cereal" >
 10. "Jingling Baby (Remixed but Still Jingling)" 
 11. "To da Break of Dawn" 
 12. "6 Minutes of Pleasure" 
 13. "Illegal Search'" 
 14. "The Power of God"

3rd Bass - Cactus Revisited 
 06. "Product of the Environment (Remix)"

Force MD's - Step To Me 
 02. "Step To Me"
 03. "How's Your Love Life?"

1991

Craig G - Now, That's More Like It 
 01. "Intro"
 02. "What You're Used To"
 03. "Girl Fever" (feat. The Flex)
 04. "Take The Bait"
 05. "Somem To Swing To"
 06. "I Want To Be In Luv" (feat. The Flex)
 07. "Give It To Me" (feat. Master Ace)
 08. "Intro II"
 09. "Ripped To Streads"
 10. "Ummm!!!!"
 11. "Smoothing Out The Rough Spots"
 12. "Feel Ya Way"
 14. "Word Association"
 15. "U-R-Not The 1" (feat. The Flex)
 16. "Swiftness"
 17. "Live Off The Top"
 18. "Going For The Throat"

Heavy D. & the Boyz - Peaceful Journey 
 04. "Sister Sister"
 07. "The Lover's Got What You Need"
 11. "Swinging With Da Hevster"

Bell Biv Devoe - WBBD-Bootcity!: The Remix Album 
 09. "She's Dope! (Epod Mix)"

Various artists - Strictly Business (soundtrack)  
 03. "Strictly Business" - performed by LL Cool J (co-produced by LL Cool J)

Marley Marl - In Control Volume II (For Your Steering Pleasure) 
 01. "Intro"
 02. "No Bullshit"
 03. "The Symphony Pt 2" (feat. Master Ace, Craig G, Big Daddy Kane, Little Daddy Shane, Kool G Rap)
 04. "Level Check"
 05. "Buffalo Soldier" (feat. Mc Amazing)
 06. "Mobil Phone"
 07. "At The Drop Of A Dime" (feat. Mc Cash)
 08. "Scanning The Dial"
 09. "Something Funky To Listen To" (feat. Nexx Phase)
 10. "America Eats The Young" (feat. Tragedy the Intelligent Hoodlum, Chuck D)
 11. "Check The Mirror" (feat. Portia)
 12. "I Be Gettin' Busy" (feat. LL Cool J)
 13. "Girl, I Was Wrong" (feat. The Flex)
 14. "Fools In Love" (feat. Heavy D., Eclipse)
 15. "Another Hooker" (feat. Big Money Wiz)
 16. "Cheatin' Days Are Over" (feat. Mike Nice)
 17. "Reach Out" (feat. Perfection)
 18. "Keep Control" (feat. Tragedy The Intelligent Hoodlum, King Tee, Grand Puba, Def Jef, Chubb Rock)
 19. "Sweet Tooth" (feat. Pure Cane Sugar)
 20. "Out For The Count" (feat. AK-B, Kev E Kev)

1992

TLC - Ooooooohhh... On the TLC Tip 
 06. "Das Da Way We Like 'Em"
 12. "This Is How It Should Be Done"

Cooly Live - Livewire 
 11. "The 1 - 4 Me"

En Vogue - Free Your Mind CDS 
 04. "Free Your Mind (Marley Marl Remix)"

1993

King Tee - Tha Triflin' Album 
 06. "At Your Own Risk (Budha Mix)"

Lords of the Underground - Here Come the Lords 
 04. "Keep It Underground"
 05. "Check It (Remix)"
 06. "Grave Digga"
 07. "Lords Prayer" (co-produced by K-Def)
 08. "Flow On (New Symphony)" (feat. Kid Deleon and Sah-B)
 09. "Madd Skillz" (produced with K-Def)
 10. "Psycho"
 12. "Sleep For Dinner (Remix)"
 15. "What's Goin' On"

Monie Love - In a Word or 2 
 01. "Wheel Of Fortune"
 02. "Greasy"
 03. "Sex U All"
 04. "Mo' Monie"
 06. "Let A Woman B A Woman"
 07. "Full Term Love"
 10. "There's A Better Way"
 11. "4 Da Children"
 12. "Born 2 B.R.E.E.D. (Hip-Hop Mix)"

LL Cool J - 14 Shots to the Dome 
 01. "How I'm Comin'"
 03. "Stand By Your Man"
 04. "A Little Somethin'"
 05. "Pink Cookies In a Plastic Bag Getting Crushed By Buildings"
 06. "Straight From Queens" (feat. Lieutenant Stitchie)
 07. "Funkadelic Relic"
 09. "(NFA) No Frontin' Allowed" (feat. Lords Of The Underground)

Da Youngstas - The Aftermath 
 06. "Lyrical Stick Up Kids"
 12. "Rip A Rhyme"

Tragedy Khadafi - Tragedy: Saga of a Hoodlum 
 06. "At Large" (produced with K-Def)
 07. "Death Row" (produced with K-Def)
 09. "Mad Brothas Know His Name" (produced with K-Def)
 12. "Pump The Funk"

1994

Heavy D. & the Boyz - Nuttin' But Love 
 05. "Something Goin' On" (co-produced by Heavy D)
 09. "Spend a Little Time on Top" (co-produced by Heavy D)

Da Youngstas - No Mercy 
 01. "Hip Hop Ride"
 03. "No Mercy"
 05. "No More Hard Times"
 06. "Put Me On"

Lords of the Underground - Keepers of the Funk 
(all tracks co-produced by Lords of the Underground)
 02. "Ready or Not" 
 03. "Tic Toc" 
 04. "Keepers of the Funk" (feat. George Clinton) 
 08. "Neva Faded" (featuring Supreme C) 
 11. "Yes Y'all" 
 12. "What U See"

Ed Lover & Doctor Dré - Back Up Off Me! 
 04. "East Coast Sound" (feat. Lords of the Underground)

World Renown - Come Take a Ride (CDS) 
 00. "Come Take a Ride"

A.D.O.R. - One For The Trouble 12" 
 A1. "One For The Trouble" (co-produced by K-Def)

1997

Capone-N-Noreaga - The War Report 

 13. "Capone Bone"
 15. "L.A., L.A. (Kuwait Mix)" (feat. Mobb Deep, Tragedy Khadafi)

1998

Fat Joe - Don Cartagena

 04. "Find Out" (feat. Armageddon)

2000

Screwball - Y2K The Album 
 20. "On the Real" (feat. Kyron, Cormega, Havoc)

Marley Marl - Hip Hop Dictionary 
 01. "Hip Hop Dictionary Introduction" (co-producer)
 02. "Haters" (feat. LL Cool J)
 03. "It's All Real" (feat. Lords Of The Underground)
 04. "Hip Hop History #1" (co-producer)
 05. "Funk S#$T" (feat. Common)
 06. "Hip Hop History #2" (co-producer)
 07. "Time Is Money" (feat. Co-Cheez)
 08. "Hip Hop History #3" (co-producer)
 09. "Funk S#$T ("E.Q" Natural Vibe Remix)" (feat. Common)
 10. "Hip Hop History #4" (co-producer)
 11. "It's All Real (Muro's Rekindled Mix)" (feat. Lords Of The Underground)
 12. "Hip Hop Dictionary Outro" (co-producer)

Sauce Money - Middle Finger U 
 08. "What's That, Fuck That"

Various artists - Nas & Ill Will Records Presents QB's Finest 
 02. "Da Bridge 2001" - performed by Capone, Cormega, Marley Marl, MC Shan, Millennium Thug, Mobb Deep, Nas, Nature, Tragedy Khadafi

2001

Marley Marl - Re-Entry 
 01. "Intro"
 02. "Do U Remember"
 03. "Three's Company" (feat. Big Daddy Kane)
 05. "Just Funky"
 06. "Who's Sicker" (feat. The Hemmingways)
 07. "Lost Beat"
 08. "Easy Type Shit" (feat. Seven Shawn)
 09. "Live Ova Beats"
 10. "Foundation Symphony" (feat. Larry 0, Seven Shawn, J. Wells and Miss Man)
 11. "So Good (feat. J. Wells and Edwin Birdsong)
 12. "Hummin'" (feat. Roy Ayers and Edwin Birdsong)
 13. "Big Faces"
 14. "What Ruling Means" (feat. Kev Brown and Grap Luva)
 15. "What U Hold Down" (feat. Troy S.L.U.G.S. and Capone)
 16. "NY, NY"

2003

Craig G - This Is Now!! 
 08. "Let's Get Up"

Troy S.L.U.G.S. - Troy S.L.U.G.S. 
 06. "Lock Da Game"
 08. "Bang Out Da Game"

2004

Nas - 10th Anniversary Edition of Illmatic 
CD2
 05. "On the Real"

2006

Busta Rhymes - New York Shit (CDS) 
 00. "New York Shit (Remix)" (feat. KRS-One & Swizz Beatz)

2007

KRS-One & Marley Marl - Hip Hop Lives 
01. "It's Alive (Intro)"
02. "Hip Hop Lives"
03. "Nothing New"
04. "I Was There"
05. "Musika (feat. Magic Juan)"
06. 'Rising to the Top"
07. "Over 30"
08. "M.A.R.L.E.Y. (Skit)"
09. "Kill a Rapper"
10. "Teacha's Back (Remixed by K-Def)"
11. "Victory (feat. Blaq Poet)"
12. "This Is What It Is"
13. "All Skool"
14. "House of Hits (feat. Busy Bee Starski)"

UGK - Underground Kingz 
CD2
 11. "Next Up" (feat. Big Daddy Kane and Kool G Rap) (produced with K-Def)

2008

Kool G Rap - Half a Klip 
 08. "With a Bullet" (featuring 5 Family Click)

Craig G & Marley Marl - Operation Take Hip Hop Back  
 01. "Intro"
 02. "Reintroduction"
 03. "Quality Work" (feat. Rakaa and Will Pack)
 04. "Made The Change"
 05. "Deep Down"
 06. "We Get It In" (feat. Talib Kweli)
 08. "All Seasons"
 09. "War Going On" (feat. Cormega)
 10. "Skates"
 11. "Stay In Ya Lane" (feat. Sadat X)
 13. "Regrets"
 14. "Not A Word"
 15. "Rock Dis" (feat. KRS-One)
 16. "Don't Make Me Laugh"
 17. "The Day Music Died"

LL Cool J - Exit 13 
 06. "You Better Watch Me" (co-produced by MWill)

2009

Raekwon - Only Built 4 Cuban Linx... Pt. II 
 04. "Pyrex Vision"

2011

Kool G Rap - Riches, Royalty & Respect 
 09. "$ Ova Bitches"

2013

LL Cool J - Authentic (Target Bonus Edition) 
 16. "Remember Me" (featuring Alicia Meyers)

2017

M-Dot - Ego and the Enemy 
 08. "Gleamin'" (featuring B.A.M.)

Singles produced by Marley Marl

 1985: "Marley Marl Scratch" MC Shan
 1986: "The Bridge" MC Shan
 1987: "Eric B. Is President" Eric B. & Rakim
 1988: "Ain't No Half Steppin'" Big Daddy Kane
 1989: "Road to the Riches" (Kool G Rap & DJ Polo)
 1989: "Together" (Masta Ace)
 1990: "Mama Said Knock You Out" LL Cool J
 1990: "Around the Way Girl" LL Cool J
 1990: "Music Man" (Masta Ace)
 1990: "Me and the Biz" (Masta Ace)
 1991: "Movin' On" (Masta Ace)
 1992: "Psycho" (Lords of the Underground)
 1992: "Full Term Love" (Monie Love)
 1994: "Tic Toc" (Lords of the Underground) 
 1994: "Hip Hop Ride" (Da Youngsta's)
 2007: "Hip Hop Lives" (KRS-One & Marley Marl)

Production discographies
Discographies of American artists